Labeo werneri is a species of freshwater ray-finned fish in genus Labeo which has only been recorded from Lake Victoria. However, the type specimen has been lost and the only other specimen was a misidentification so the taxonomic validity of this species is in doubt.

References 

Labeo
Fish described in 1929